John J. Rooney may refer to:

John J. Rooney (judge) (1915–1998), Wyoming Supreme Court justice
John J. Rooney (politician) (1903–1975), congressman from New York